The Bible has been translated into Italian many times since the first printed translation, the so-called Malermi Bible, by Nicolò Malermi in 1471. The CEI Bible published by the Episcopal Conference of Italy (Conferenza Episcopale Italiana) is the official version of the Italian Catholic Church. Prior to the initial publication of the CEI edition in 1971, the most common Italian translation of the bible was that of Archbishop Antonio Martini, published from 1769–1781. The 1607 Italian translation by Giovanni Diodati is the standard reference used in Italian Protestantism; a revised edition of this translation in modern Italian, Nuova Diodati, was published in 1991.

Early translations

The first printed translation of the Bible into Italian was the so-called Malermi Bible, by Nicolò Malermi in 1471 from the Latin version Vulgate. 
Other early Catholic translations into Italian were made by the Dominican Fra Zaccaria of Florence in 1542 (the New Testament only) and by Santi Marmochino in 1543 (complete Bible).

Protestant translations  were made by Antonio Brucioli in 1530, by Massimo Teofilo in 1552 and by Giovanni Diodati in 1607 who translated the Bible from Latin and Jewish documents; Diodati's version is the reference version for Italian Protestantism. This edition was revised in 1641, 1712, 1744, 1819 and 1821. A revised edition in modern Italian, Nuova Diodati, was published in 1991.

The most used Catholic Bible translation in Italian before the 1971 CEI edition was that of Archbishop Antonio Martini. It was published from 1769 to 1771 (New Testament) and 1776 to 1781 (Old Testament), and it was formally approved by the papacy. It consists of parallel columns of Latin Vulgate and Italian with long and detailed notes based mainly on the Church Fathers writings. The translation is based on the Vulgate checked with the original Greek and Hebrew texts (Martini was assisted in interpreting the Old Testament by a rabbi). It also includes a list of the main textual variants for each book. In the 1870 edition, the notes were rewritten and shortened.

From 1858–1860 the Jewish Samuel David Luzzatto translated part of the Old Testament into Italian.

Translations since the 20th century
Major Bible editions published since the 20th century include:
 la Riveduta of 1924 by the Waldesan Giovanni Luzzi, based on the Wescott-Hort text, revised in 1994 and in 2006 with the title Nuova riveduta;
 La Bibbia of Eusebio Tintori, 1931;
 La Sacra Bibbia edited by Giuseppe Ricciotti, 1955;
 La Sacra Bibbia edited by Pontifical Biblical Institute, 9 volumes, 1958;
 La Bibbia, Edizioni Paoline, 1958 (1968);
 La Bibbia of Jesuit Alberto Vaccari, 1958;
 La Bibbia edited by Fulvio Nardoni, 1960;
 Collana La Sacra Bibbia, Marietti 1947-1960, edited by Salvatore Garofalo, in many volumes;
 Traduzione del Nuovo Mondo delle Sacre Scritture, 1967;
 La Bibbia Concordata, 1968 Mondadori, an Interfaith edition edited by a group of Catholic, Jewish, Protestant and Orthodox scholars;
 La Sacra Bibbia edited by Enrico Galbiati, Angelo Penna and Piero Rossano. Utet 1963, 1964, 1973;
 La Sacra Bibbia (CEI edition), 1971 (1974);
 La Bibbia di Gerusalemme, 1974
 Bibbia TILC, an Interconfessional edition edited by Catholic and Protestant scholars in 1985;
 Nuovissima versione edited by Edizione Paoline in 1987;
Traduzione del Nuovo Mondo delle Sacre Scritture, 1987, based on the English 1984 edition of the New World Translation of the Holy Scriptures. Produced and published by Jehovah's Witnesses;
 La Sacra Bibbia (second CEI edition), 2008;
 La Bibbia di Gerusalemme, 2009
Traduzione del Nuovo Mondo delle Sacre Scritture (nwt), 2017, the Bible is based on the English 2013 revision of the New World Translation of the Holy Scriptures. Produced and published by Jehovah's Witnesses;
Traduzione del Nuovo Mondo delle Sacre Scritture (edizione per lo studio) (nwtsty), 2018, this electronic-only Bible is based on English 2015 edition of the New World Translation of the Holy Scriptures (Study Edition). Produced and published by Jehovah's Witnesses.

The Bible of CEI (Conferenza Episcopale Italiana) is the official version of the Italian Catholic Church. It was first printed in 1971 (editio princeps) as the work of only three translators in order to keep the text more consistent, and revised in 1974 (editio minor). A totally new version, published in 2008, after a revision of both the Testaments, that took into account newly discovered documents for the New Testament, was begun in 1997. Both the editions of La Bibbia di Gerusalemme (the Italian Jerusalem Bible) are notable for their introductions and footnotes, translated from the French original, but use texts from the CEI editions.

Comparison

References

External links
 Bible Malermi (1487) digitalized
 online text of the Martini Bible
 online text of the CEI-2008 Bible
 online texts of the CEI, Nuova Riveduta, Nuova Diodati, Riveduta and Diodati Bibles
 online texts of various translations, including the 1974 and 2008 CEI Bibles
Traduzione del Nuovo Mondo (edizione per lo studio) - New World Translation (Study Edition)

Italian
Italian literature